The 2016 Junior League World Series took place August 14–21, 2016 in Taylor, Michigan, United States. Taoyuan, Taiwan defeated Kapaa, Hawaii in the championship game. It was Taiwan's the fourth straight championship.

Due to the addition of the Australia region; a modified–double–elimination format was introduced.

Teams

Results

United States Bracket

International Bracket

Elimination Round

References

Junior League World Series
Junior League World Series
Junior